Events from the year 1551 in art.

Events
 Cristóvão Lopes succeeds his father Gregório Lopes as the royal painter of King John III of Portugal

Paintings

 Pieter Aertsen – A Meat Stall with the Holy Family Giving Alms
 Pietro Negroni – Madonna with Child in Glory and Saints Paul and Luke
 Titian – Philip II in Armour
 Caterina van Hemessen – Portrait of a Lady (approximate date; Bowes Museum)

Births
March 9 - Alessandro Alberti, Italian painter (died 1596) 
April 30 - Jacopo da Empoli, Italian Mannerist painter (died 1640)
 Luigi Benfatto, Italian painter, nephew of Paolo Veronese (died 1611)
 Jacopo Chimenti, Italian late-mannerist painter (died 1640)
 Camillo Procaccini, Italian painter, in 1571 a student in the Bolognese painters’ guild (died 1629)
 Tiburzio Vergelli, Italian sculptor and founder (died 1609)
 probable
 1551/1552: John de Critz, Flemish portrait painter active in England (died 1642)

Deaths
May 18 - Domenico di Pace Beccafumi, Italian Renaissance-Mannerist painter (born 1486)
July - Adriaen Isenbrandt, Flemish Northern Renaissance painter (born 1480-1490)
July 11 - Girolamo Genga, Italian painter and architect (born 1476)
date unknown
Diego de Arroyo, Spanish miniature painter (born 1498)
Nicolas Chantereine, French sculptor and architect (born c.1485)
Étienne Peson, French "primitive" painter (born 1485)
Shin Saimdang, Korean genre works painter and calligraphist (born 1504)
Juan de Villoldo, Spanish religious painter (date of birth unknown)

References

 
Years of the 16th century in art